Poppe is a surname, and may refer to:

Eduard Poppe, German rugby union international
Edward Poppe, beatified Belgian priest
Enno Poppe, German composer and conductor
Erik Poppe, Norwegian film director 
Erling Poppe, British engineer of Norwegian descent
Guido Poppe, Belgian malacologist and shell dealer
Ludo Poppe, producer of Third World reality TV 
Nicholas Poppe, Russian linguist
Nils Poppe, Swedish actor 
Patti Poppe, American businesswoman, CEO of CMS Energy
Peter August Poppe, Norwegian engineer
Ulrike Poppe, German politician
Walter Poppe, German Generalleutnant during WW II
Walter Poppe (footballer), German international footballer